Ihor-Andrij Maritczak (born 17 February 1973 in Vienna) is an Austrian former ice dancer. With Daria-Larissa Maritczak, he became a two-time Austrian national champion. They competed at five ISU Championships, including the 1991 World Championships in Munich, Germany, and 1992 European Championships in Lausanne, Switzerland. Their best result, 12th, came at the 1992 World Junior Championships in Hull, Quebec, Canada.

As of 2017, Maritczak is working as a lawyer in Vienna.

Competitive highlights 
With Daria-Larissa Maritczak

References

External links 
 

1973 births
Austrian male ice dancers
Living people
Figure skaters from Vienna